Catedral is a terminal station of the Line D of the Buenos Aires Underground. From here, passengers may transfer to the Perú station on Line A and the Bolívar station on Line E.

Overview
It is located at the intersection of Roque Sáenz Peña Avenue and Florida Street, which gave the original name of the station. Its current name comes from the Buenos Aires Metropolitan Cathedral, located in the vicinity of the station. This station had the name Florida, as recorded on maps of the network of 1955.

The station was inaugurated on 3 June 1937 as part of the inaugural section of Line D, between Catedral and Tribunales. In 1997 it was declared a national historic monument.

The station was used as a set in the 1996 Argentine science fiction film Moebius.

Gallery

Nearby
 Plaza de Mayo
 Florida Street
 Buenos Aires Cabildo
 Avenida de Mayo

References

External links

Buenos Aires Underground stations
Railway stations opened in 1937
1937 establishments in Argentina
National Historic Monuments of Argentina